Markus Kuhn (born 5 May 1986) is a former German gridiron football defensive tackle. He was selected by the New York Giants in the seventh round of the 2012 NFL Draft. In December 2014 he recovered a fumble against the Tennessee Titans and scored, becoming the first German to earn an NFL touchdown. Kuhn played college football at NC State.

Early years 
Born in Mannheim, Germany, Kuhn started playing football at age 14. He was introduced to the sport while spending vacations with his family in Florida. His interest and curiosity led him to start playing football in Germany and he eventually began playing linebacker and defensive tackle for the Weinheim Longhorns, winning Rookie of The Year. Kuhn was a four-time German Football League All-Star.

College career 
In 2007 Kuhn decided to play collegiate football. Without access to college recruiters, Kuhn resorted to personally visiting colleges with his father in 2007. He was ultimately given a scholarship at North Carolina State University. At NC State, Kuhn was part of the Champs Sports Bowl winning team in 2010 and the Belk Bowl winning team in 2011. In 2012 Kuhn earned a degree in Business economics.

Professional career

New York Giants

2012 season 
Kuhn was drafted in the 7th round of the 2012 NFL Draft by the New York Giants.

On August 31, 2012, it was announced that Kuhn had made the final roster. He made his debut in the season's inaugural game with a tackle assist, a feat he matched in the subsequent games. He started his first game in Week 6 against Cleveland Browns. During the game against the Cincinnati Bengals in week 10, Kuhn suffered a torn ACL and missed the rest of the 2012 season. The Giants finished the season 9-7 and out of the playoffs.

2013 season 
Almost one year after his ACL tear, Kuhn returned to practicing with his team. Because of his strong work ethic, the coaches named Kuhn on November 6 to the Giants active roster. Kuhn had his season debut in Week 13 against the Washington Redskins, a game the Giants won. In week 14, defensive tackle Kuhn returned a kickoff 13 yards, after the San Diego Chargers deliberately bounced a short kick, after a score with 19 seconds remaining in the first half. Kuhn and the Giants ended the season 7-9, failing to make the playoffs.

2014 season 
During the offseason, it was published that Kuhn has a good friendship with former Giant and 2014 Hall of Famer Michael Strahan. Kuhn was born in Mannheim and Strahan experienced the game of football in this city for the first time at the Mannheim Redskins (now the Rhein Neckar Bandits). In Week one, the Giants lost against the Detroit Lions. Kuhn missed the game because of an injury.

In week 14, on December 7th, 2014, Kuhn returned a fumble 26 yards for a touchdown against the Titans. It was the Giants first non-offensive TD of the season. It was also the first ever touchdown scored by a German national in the NFL.

2015 season 
Ahead of the 2015 season it was announced that the 2015 NFL season would see a new broadcasting arrangement in Germany with (at least) two games every Sunday being broadcast live in free-to-air Television on ProSieben Maxx as well as on a free live stream on ran.de. Kuhn became a columnist for the website of ran.de, describing his day-to-day life in the NFL and how he sees his games. On the field the 2015 season saw him secure the ball one more time for his team, when he returned a fumble by Tom Brady against the New England Patriots, a game that the Giants ultimately lost on a late field goal. On December 25, 2015, Kuhn was placed on injured reserve due to a knee injury he suffered against the Miami Dolphins on December 14, 2015.

New England Patriots 
On April 7, 2016, Kuhn signed with the New England Patriots. On September 3, 2016, he was released by the Patriots as part of final roster cuts.

Retirement 
On January 27, 2017, Kuhn announced his retirement, never having played in a regular season game since being injured on December 14, 2015.

References

External links 
 New York Giants bio
 NC State bio
 ESPN Profile

1986 births
Living people
American football defensive tackles
German Football League players
German players of American football
NC State Wolfpack football players
New England Patriots players
New York Giants players
People from Weinheim
Sportspeople from Karlsruhe (region)